Takin' It Back is the fifth major-label studio album by American singer-songwriter Meghan Trainor. The album was released on October 21, 2022, by Epic Records. Trainor worked with producers including Federico Vindver, Gian Stone, Kid Harpoon, and Tyler Johnson, to create it. Artists featured on the album include Scott Hoying, Teddy Swims, Theron Theron, Natti Natasha, and Arturo Sandoval. It is a doo-wop and bubblegum pop album, which Trainor conceived as a return to the sound of her debut major-label studio album, Title (2015), after its title track went viral on TikTok. The album's lyrical themes revolve around motherhood and self-acceptance.

Trainor promoted Takin' It Back with public appearances and televised performances. The album was supported by two singles, "Bad for Me" and "Made You Look". The latter became her first song to enter the top 20 on the Billboard Hot 100 since 2016 and her first top-five single in the United Kingdom since 2015, reaching the top 10 in other countries as well. Reviewers thought the album effectively showcased Trainor's maturity and growth over her career as well as her musicality, deeming it unfair to label it a sequel to Title. It debuted at number 16 on the US Billboard 200, and reached the top 40 in Australia, Canada, Denmark, the Netherlands, and Norway.

A deluxe edition of the album was released on March 10, 2023, featuring an additional four tracks.

Background 
In March 2018, Meghan Trainor described material she was writing for her third major-label studio album as her "best work yet". The underperformance of its preceding singles led to a loss of her confidence in the project. Its release was marred by several delays, as Trainor rewrote it four times in an attempt to "adapt to what's going on in the music industry". Treat Myself was released to mixed reviews in January 2020. She followed it up with the Christmas album A Very Trainor Christmas later that year.

Trainor gave birth to her son in February 2021. Her 2014 song "Title" attained viral popularity on video-sharing service TikTok later that year, which influenced the direction she decided to take for her fifth major-label studio album. In May 2021, Trainor announced her intention to pivot to the doo-wop sound of her debut major-label studio album, Title (2015), on it. She stated: "The people have spoken and I hear you", and noted that motherhood made her a stronger woman and more emotional songwriter. Trainor further elaborated on the album's creative process: "Everything came quicker to me. Every song, I would have the chorus written before I went into the session. And usually, you go in with an idea and people will be like, 'that's cute, let's try something else.' But for some reason, this round, they were like, 'that's it, let's run with it.' So everything you hear, you can know that I started it first alone [...] And I think they relate to a lot of people out there". She added: "She's a motha! I feel like my songwriting is much better since I had a C-section."

Composition 
The digital edition of Takin' It Back contains 16 tracks; on physical editions, the track "Remind Me" is exclusive to the Target version. It predominantly has a doo-wop and bubblegum pop sound. Its subject matter revolves around her pregnancy's impact, and "how it's hard and [she is] not perfect all the time. And [she is] learning to love that." Trainor described the material as "big, powerful songs that mean a lot". She stated, "It's like Title 2.0. It's my old school, it's true to myself in all the weird genres that I go to, but also modern with my doo-wop in there. The lyrics are stronger than ever, and it's still a party." Takin' It Backs title was inspired by the positive feeling Trainor felt after Mozella told her other artists wished to emulate her sound, the first time she felt it since writing "Dear Future Husband" (2015).

The opening track, "Sensitive", is a 1950s-influenced a cappella song built on harmonies and features vocals by American singer Scott Hoying. "Made You Look" is a doo-wop song, which was inspired by Trainor's insecurities about body image after her pregnancy, and an exercise where her therapist asked her to look at herself naked for five minutes. She wrote the title track about bringing back old-school music which featured more real instruments. It has a digital style and incorporates modern R&B beats. The fourth track, "Don't I Make It Look Easy", has percussion instrumentation and R&B elements; its lyrics are about the duties Trainor assumed as a new mother, and posting to social media, which she thought would make it more relatable. "Shook" is about her impressive looks and references her rear end. "Bad for Me", which features vocals by American singer-songwriter Teddy Swims, is a pop song with gospel influences and an instrumentation of piano and an acoustic six-string guitar. It is about a toxic relationship with a family member and distancing oneself from them. The seventh track, "Superwoman", is a ballad on which Trainor emphasizes the various identities and arenas women steer through, such as "strong and vulnerable, successful yet humble". She admits she "can't do it all" on the song; PopMatterss Peter Piatkowski described it as "an achingly open and vulnerable poem about a woman trying to be everything to everyone", that dismissed common narratives about women being "girlboss[es]" and acknowledged difficulties faced by them. "Rainbow", a song about coming out and self-acceptance, opens as a slow piano ballad and transitions into a doo-wop song midway.

The ninth track, "Breezy", is a reggae song which features Theron Theron, incorporating debonair horns and clinking piano riffs in its instrumentation. "Mama Wanna Mambo" features guest appearances by Natti Natasha and Arturo Sandoval, and was inspired by Perry Como's 1954 single "Papa Loves Mambo". It is a reggaeton song about mothers wanting a dance break in the middle of caring for their children, a concept she thought would resonate with moms on TikTok. Trainor demands loyalty from her partner and assures him that her excesively dramatic behavior is "all out of love" on "Drama Queen". On the 12th track, "While You're Young", she directly asks people who feel inadequate and face insecurities to take chances and learn through experience: "Make mistakes, give your heart a break". "Lucky" is about the gratitude one feels for having someone else in their life. "Dance About It" is a 1970s-influenced midtempo disco funk song with a "glitter-ball disco pulse". The penultimate track, "Remind Me", was the first song Trainor wrote for the album at a time when she was struggling with self-doubt: "I was like, I'm lost. I feel like I lost my power. I can't look at myself right now. I'm struggling more than ever. And I need my husband and people who love me to remind me that I'm awesome because I don't feel awesome." The album closes with "Final Breath", a moody and ruminative downtempo song where Trainor contemplates the end of a relationship: "If I could, I'd do it all over again".

Promotion
On May 11, 2022, Trainor uploaded an episode titled "Workin' on Making An Album" on Workin on It, a podcast she hosts with her brother, dedicated to the album's creation process. "Bad for Me" was released as its lead single on June 24, 2022. The song reached the top 30 on radio-format charts in the United States, and entered digital sales charts in Canada and the United Kingdom. Trainor and Swims performed it on Jimmy Kimmel Live! and The Late Late Show with James Corden. The second single, "Made You Look", was serviced to hot adult contemporary radio stations in the United States on October 31, 2022. The song went viral on TikTok. It became Trainor's first song since 2016 to enter the top 40 on the US Billboard Hot 100 and her first top-10 single on the UK Singles Chart in seven years, reaching the top 10 in other countries including Australia and New Zealand. On October 21, 2022, Trainor performed "Bad for Me", "Don't I Make It Look Easy", and "Made You Look" on The Today Show. Three days later, she reprised "Made You Look" on The Tonight Show Starring Jimmy Fallon.

Critical reception

AllMusic's Stephen Thomas Erlewine believed that Takin' It Back employs "electronic affectations [as] merely a part of the execution", with "old-fashioned" but contemporarily presented tracks at its heart. He added, "this doesn't mean that Takin' It Back is a state-of-the-art pop record. Trainor's dedication to reviving the spirit of Title means that the attitude and melody can occasionally seem preserved in amber [...] but taken as a whole, separated from trends and fashions, Takin' It Back showcases her knack for hooks and musical theater pizazz with cool efficiency." Martina Inchingolo of the Associated Press wrote that the album featured a more adult version of her, showcasing her growth since marriage and motherhood; she described it as a "therapy session", "an uplifting fun experience", and a "fluctuation of genres and feelings", which makes the listener feel less solitary by its conclusion. Piatkowski thought it reflected the confidence Trainor has gained from becoming a "major pop star", and considered it inaccurate to label it a retread to her debut record. He thought Takin' It Back did not constitute a definitive return to form for her, some of its catchier parts "sound[ing] light and airy to the point of candy floss", but believed its ballads, on which she attempted to "write something more substantial", were the high points of the album and highlighted her "talents as a top-shelf pop tunesmith". Writing for Riff, Piper Westrom believed the album "largely sticks to what [Trainor] knows" and would not shock fans of her previous work, "check[ing] all the boxes for listeners and mak[ing] for a solid pop album". Renowned for Sounds Max Akass thought it was her "most complete album to date" and appreciated her intention to take more power over her career after being controlled by her record label on previous releases; he stated that Trainor ventured into new musical territory and took her music to "more interesting places".

Commercial performance
In the United States, Takin' It Back debuted at number 16 on the US Billboard 200, Trainor's highest entry since her second major-label studio album, Thank You (2016). The album debuted at number 21 on the Canadian Albums Chart. It reached number 67 in the United Kingdom and number 30 in Australia. Takin' It Back charted at number 12 in Norway, number 19 in the Netherlands, number 37 in Denmark, number 82 in Spain, number 98 in Switzerland, and number 99 in Ireland.

Track listing

Notes
  signifies an additional producer
 Digital editions of Takin' It Back feature all 16 tracks on the standard and 20 on the deluxe, while physical versions of the CD album do not feature "Remind Me". This is exclusive to the Target CD in the US.

Personnel
Musicians

 Meghan Trainor – lead vocals, background vocals (all tracks); vocal arrangement (1, 6), programming (7, 16), keyboards (13), piano (16)
 Scott Hoying – background vocals (1, 6, 8), vocal arrangement (1, 6)
 Federico Vindver – keyboards (2, 3, 6, 9, 11, 14), programming (2–4, 6, 9, 11, 13, 14); drums, percussion (2); guitar (3, 4, 6, 11, 13, 14), bass (6), piano (6, 8, 11, 14), background vocals (10) 
 Jesse McGinty – baritone saxophone, trombone (2)
 Mike Cordone – trumpet (2)
 Guillermo Vadalá – bass (3, 4, 9, 11)
 Drew Taubenfeld – electric guitar (3), acoustic guitar (7), guitar (11, 13)
 Justin Trainor – background vocals (3, 5, 6, 10–12), keyboards (3), programming (3, 7, 13, 14)
 Tristan Hurd – trumpet (3, 12, 14)
 Kiel Feher – drums (4)
 Andrew Synowiec – guitar (4)
 Daryl Sabara – background vocals (5, 6, 10, 11, 13)
 Chris Pepe – background vocals (5, 13)
 Gian Stone – background vocals (5, 10, 13), programming (5, 9, 13), bass (8, 13); guitar, keyboards (13)
 Ryan Trainor – background vocals (5, 10, 14)
 Sean Douglas – background vocals (5, 10, 11, 13), keyboards (13)
 Ivan Jackson – trumpet (5), horn (9, 13)
 Teddy Swims – lead vocals, background vocals (6)
 Ajay Bhattacharyya – background vocals (6)
 Isaiah Gage – strings (7)
 Ian Franzino – background vocals, programming (8)
 Andrew Haas – background vocals, guitar, piano, programming (8)
 Teddy Geiger – background vocals, guitar, piano, programming (8)
 The Regiment – horn (8)
 Kurt Thum – organ (8, 9)
 John Arndt – piano (8)
 Theron Theron – lead vocals (9)
 Brian Letiecq – guitar (9)
 Morgan Price – horn (9, 13)
 Angel Torres – alto saxophone (10)
 Ramon Sanchez – arrangement (10)
 Natti Natasha – lead vocals, background vocals (10)
 Sammy Vélez – baritone saxophone (10)
 Pedro Pérez – bass (10)
 Pedro "Pete" Perignon – bongos (10)
 William "Kachiro" Thompson – congas (10)
 Josué Urbiba – tenor saxophone (10)
 Jean Carlos Camuñas – timbales (10)
 Lester Pérez – trombone (10)
 Anthony Rosado – trombone (10)
 Jésus Alonso – trumpet (10)
 Arturo Sandoval – trumpet (10)
 Luis Angel Figueroa – trumpet (10)
 Kid Harpoon – programming (12, 16); acoustic guitar, bass, electric guitar, piano, synthesizer (12)
 Aaron Sterling – drums (12)
 Tyler Johnson – programming (12, 16), keyboards (12)
 Cole Kamen-Green – trumpet (12)
 Greg Wieczorek – drums (13)
 Ben Rice – guitar, keyboards (13)

Technical

 Randy Merrill – mastering
 Meghan Trainor – mixing (1, 7, 14), engineering (1), vocal production (all tracks)
 Justin Trainor – mixing (1, 7, 14), engineering (1–14, 16)
 Jeremie Inhaber – mixing (2, 3, 5, 6, 10, 11, 13, 14)
 Josh Gudwin – mixing (4)
 Gian Stone – mixing (8), engineering (5, 8, 9, 13), vocal production (5, 9, 13)
 Kevin Davis – mixing (9)
 Spike Stent – mixing (12)
 Federico Vindver – engineering (2–4, 6, 9–11, 14), vocal production (4, 10, 14)
 Peter Hanaman – engineering (4, 14)
 Ian Franzino – engineering (8)
 Andrew Haas – engineering (8)
 Chad Copelin – engineering (8)
 Carlitos Vélasquez – engineering (10)
 Jeremy Hatcher – engineering (12, 16)
 Brian Rajaratnam – engineering (12, 16)
 Scott Hoying – vocal production (6)
 Heidi Wang – engineering assistance (4)
 Matt Wolach – engineering assistance (12, 16)

Charts

Release history

References 

2022 albums
Epic Records albums
Meghan Trainor albums
Albums produced by Stint (producer)
Albums produced by Meghan Trainor
Bubblegum pop albums
Doo-wop albums